

303001–303100 

|-bgcolor=#f2f2f2
| colspan=4 align=center | 
|}

303101–303200 

|-bgcolor=#f2f2f2
| colspan=4 align=center | 
|}

303201–303300 

|-id=265
| 303265 Littmann ||  || Mark Littmann (born 1939), a professor in the School of Journalism at the University of Tennessee, where he holds the Julia G. & Alfred G. Hill Chair of Excellence in Science, Technology, and Medical Writing. || 
|}

303301–303400 

|-bgcolor=#f2f2f2
| colspan=4 align=center | 
|}

303401–303500 

|-bgcolor=#f2f2f2
| colspan=4 align=center | 
|}

303501–303600 

|-id=546
| 303546 Bourbaki || 2005 FR || Nicolas Bourbaki, a collective pseudonym under which a group of mathematicians wrote several books on modern advanced mathematics. || 
|}

303601–303700 

|-id=648
| 303648 Mikszáth ||  || Kálmán Mikszáth (1847–1910), a Hungarian novelist and journalist. || 
|}

303701–303800 

|-id=710
| 303710 Velpeau ||  || Alfred-Armand-Louis-Marie Velpeau (1795–1867), a French anatomist and surgeon. || 
|}

303801–303900 

|-bgcolor=#f2f2f2
| colspan=4 align=center | 
|}

303901–304000 

|-id=909
| 303909 Tomknops ||  || Tom Knops (1978–2011), a pilot with Tyrolean Airways. The name was proposed by Sofie Delanoye and Jeroen Maes, friends of Belgian discoverer Peter De Cat || 
|}

References 

303001-304000